Ice World, often referred to as Ice World Arena or Totowa Ice World, was an American sporting venue located in Totowa, New Jersey. The arena was located on New Jersey Route 62 at an interchange with U.S. Route 46.

Function
As its name implied, Ice World was an ice skating rink that was also used for other functions.

Training facility
When the New Jersey Devils came over from Colorado in 1982, they chose Ice World as their practice facility. They stayed there until 1986, when the team signed a contract to utilize South Mountain Arena in West Orange for that purpose.

Boxing
Ice World also saw heavy use as a facility for professional boxing. At the time, trainer Lou Duva's son Dan was operating Main Events, a promotional company, out of Totowa and since Ice World had a seating capacity of 3,000 people, he began promoting shows there in 1978. Over thirty cards promoted by Dan Duva took place inside Ice World, with more than a few of them taking place before a nationwide television audience on ABC.

Professional wrestling
Another major New York area promoter, Vincent J. McMahon, also utilized Ice World to bring his World Wide Wrestling Federation wrestlers to the local fans. The first such show happened in 1978, with Bob Backlund facing Spiros Arion in the main event. The company, which eventually became known as the World Wrestling Federation, would promote shows at Ice World until 1981.

Demise

Eventually Main Events stopped promoting boxing events at Ice World, and the loss of the Devils to South Mountain Arena also hurt the revenue stream. The arena would close before the decade was out.

Shortly after Ice World closed its doors for good, the building was leased by Supermarkets General Corporation, which decided to convert the facility into retail space and reopened it as a Rickel Home Center. The store remained open through 1997, when it and the rest of the Rickel chain was liquidated after a bankruptcy filing.

After Rickel closed, the former Ice World became home to two clothing stores. The first was a concept store devised by off-price retailer Filene's Basement called Aisle 3, which opened in 1999 and was notable for only doing business on weekends while the rest of the week was spent stocking the store with merchandise. The idea failed and within a year, Filene's Basement ended the experiment and liquidated all of the stores. Today the former Ice World is occupied by another off-price retailer, the discount fashion warehouse chain Forman Mills.

References

Boxing venues in New Jersey
Buildings and structures in Passaic County, New Jersey
Ice rinks
Wrestling venues in the United States
Defunct indoor arenas in the United States
New Jersey Devils
Totowa, New Jersey